Michael Glisson is an Army National Guard brigadier general who currently serves as the Chairman of the Joint Staff of the Illinois National Guard. He was appointed by Governor of Illinois Bruce Rauner in 2016.

As Director of Joint Staff, he is responsible for developing and coordinating all policies, programs and plans in Joint Matters that affect Illinois' 13,000 Army and Air National Guard personnel.

Military career
Michael Glisson joined the Reserve Officer Training Corps at Southern Illinois University Carbondale and received his commission in 1988. Glisson deployed with the entire 33rd Infantry Brigade Combat Team to Afghanistan from 2008 to 2009, and was then put in command of the 65th Troop Command Brigade immediately prior to his current post.

Glisson was nominated for the Chairman of the Joint Staff in October 2015, and officially appointed on 7 January 2016.

Civilian career 
Glisson has a degree in metalsmithing from Southern Illinois University Carbondale, and currently operates a blacksmith shop out of Missouri.

References

Living people
United States Army generals
National Guard (United States) generals
United States Army Command and General Staff College alumni
Year of birth missing (living people)